Adyaksha In America is a 2019 Indian Kannada-language romantic comedy. It was written by Shafi and directed by Yoganand Muddanna, in his directorial debut. It features Sharan and Ragini Dwivedi in the lead roles. The supporting cast includes Sadhu Kokila and Rangayana Raghu. The score and soundtrack for the film is done by V. Harikrishna and cinematography is done by Sudhakar Siddharth and Anish. The editing is done by K. M. Prakash. The film marks the 25th film of actress, Ragini Dwivedi. 

The film is a spiritual sequel to the 2014 film Adyaksha and a remake of 2015 Malayalam film Two Countries starring Dileep and Mamta Mohandas in the lead.

Synopsis
A. Ullas is a scamster living in a small town who will do anything for good money. A confusion leads him to marry a rich NRI girl, who has an alcohol problem. Then Ullas tries to sweep away the money of the girl and things becomes complicated

Cast 

 Sharan as A Ullas
 Ragini Dwivedi as Nandini
 Sadhu Kokila as Jimmy Carter 
 Shivaraj K. R. Pete as Venky
 Rangayana Raghu
 Makarand Deshpande as Chaman Lal Sheth
 Tabla Nani
 Ashok as Father of Ullas
 Padmaja Rao as Mother of  Ullas
 Disha Pandey as Simran
 Thaarak Ponnappa as O Ullas
 Chitra Shenoy as 
 Avinash 
 Prakash Belawadi as Prakash
 Rockline Sudakar aide of O Ullas
 Sunaina Balekundri as Prakash's  wife

Production 
The principal photography of the film was held in April 2018 in America. First actor Sharan was on board for the project. Later actress Ragini Dwivedi was on board. Then V. Harikrishna was on board to score music for the film. The makers announced that it will be a sequel project to the 2014 comedy hit Adyaksha. The film's major portions have been shot in America. Only few portions of the film has been shot in Bengaluru and Mysuru.

Release 
The film was released on 4 October 2019 in Karanataka.

Music 

The film's background score and the soundtracks are composed V. Harikrishna. The music rights were acquired by D Beats music company.

Reception 
Times of India wrote "Adhyaksha in America is a script that is tailor-made for Sharan fans. This remake of the Malayalam film Two Countries sticks to the original narrative, while it also has the elements that a Kannada comedy lover would want. The film has more than its share of laughs, and it is picturised well with a good cast too".

References

External links 

 

2010s Kannada-language films
2019 romantic comedy films
Indian romantic comedy films
2019 directorial debut films
Films scored by V. Harikrishna
2019 films
Films shot in Mysore
Films shot in Bangalore
Kannada remakes of Malayalam films